Acacia telmica is a shrub of the genus Acacia and the subgenus Phyllodineae. It is native to a small area in the  Mid West region of Western Australia.

It blooms from July to September and produces yellow flowers.

See also
 List of Acacia species

References

telmica
Acacias of Western Australia